Jeroen Petrus Maria Delmee (born March 8, 1973 in Boxtel) is a field hockey player from the Netherlands. Delmee was an Olympic champion for the Netherlands in the 1996 and 2000 Summer Olympics. After working as head coach of Dutch field hockey club Tilburg and head coach of the France men's national team (2017-2021), he started as the head coach of the Netherlands men's national team in september 2021.

References

External links
 

1973 births
Living people
Dutch male field hockey players
Dutch field hockey coaches
Field hockey players at the 1996 Summer Olympics
1998 Men's Hockey World Cup players
Field hockey players at the 2000 Summer Olympics
2002 Men's Hockey World Cup players
Field hockey players at the 2004 Summer Olympics
2006 Men's Hockey World Cup players
Field hockey players at the 2008 Summer Olympics
Olympic field hockey players of the Netherlands
Olympic gold medalists for the Netherlands
Olympic silver medalists for the Netherlands
People from Boxtel
Sportspeople from North Brabant
Olympic medalists in field hockey
Medalists at the 2004 Summer Olympics
Medalists at the 2000 Summer Olympics
Medalists at the 1996 Summer Olympics
HC Den Bosch players
Oranje Zwart players